Super Inday and the Golden Bibe is a 1988 Filipino superhero comedy film directed by Luciano B. Carlos, written by Jose Javier Reyes, and starring Maricel Soriano and child actress Aiza Seguerra as the respective titular characters, alongside Eric Quizon, Manilyn Reynes, Janno Gibbs, and Melanie Marquez. Produced by Regal Films, it was released on June 23, 1988. Critic Lav Diaz gave the film a positive review, praising the costumes of the villains but criticizing the lack of distinction between right and wrong in a scene involving theft by children.

Cast
Maricel Soriano as Super Inday / Inday
Aiza Seguerra as the Golden Bibe / Snow White
Eric Quizon as Henzel, a reporter
Manilyn Reynes as 
Janno Gibbs
Melanie Marquez as Babaeng Alakdan
Nova Villa
Jimmy Santos as Brutus, the stepfather of Inday
Mel Martinez
Michael Roberts
Palito
Ramil Rodriguez
Roy Alvarez
Flora Gasser
Evelyn Vargas
Bomber Moran
Jack Fajardo

Release
Super Inday and the Golden Bibe was released in Philippine theaters on June 23, 1988. It was originally due for release on June 9, but Regal Films head Lily Monteverde belatedly moved it to two weeks later the day before, with an industry observer speculating that it is to avoid the release of Rambo III in local theaters.

Critical response
Lav Diaz, writing for the Manila Standard, gave Super Inday and the Golden Bibe a positive review. He expressed that the film has almost everything kids like, and especially gave praise to the villains' costumes for being cartoon-like and not looking fake. However, he criticized the film's lack of a clearly demonstrated difference between right and wrong for when the kids steal a chicken from their neighbor to save the duck Snow White from getting killed by Brutus, stating that "it is true that the cliched fight between a disciple of good and the evil spirits was demonstrated but it is not just the evil spirits that are bad. It is also bad to steal – even if it was presented as simply for fun."

Home media
The film was released on DVD by Regal Entertainment in 2006.

References

External links

1988 films
1988 fantasy films
1980s superhero films
Filipino-language films
Films about shapeshifting
Films set in Pampanga
Regal Entertainment films
Films directed by Luciano B. Carlos